Sargam is a 1979 Hindi-language drama film written and directed by K. Viswanath. It was the Hindi version of his earlier Telugu film Siri Siri Muvva (1976), which also starred Jaya Prada and made her a star in South India. She made her Hindi film debut with this film, repeating her role of a mute dancer.

The film stars Rishi Kapoor as her partner, Shashikala as her stepmother, Shreeram Lagoo as her father, with Shakti Kapoor, Aruna Irani, Asrani, Vijay Arora and Om Shivpuri. Laxmikant-Pyarelal composed the memorable songs, which won the only Filmfare Award for the film. Anand Bakshi wrote the lyrics. Mohammed Rafi has sung all seven songs, three of them were duets with Lata Mangeshkar, including the famous song, "Dafliwale Dafli Baja", "Koyal Boli, Duniya Doli" and  "Parbat Ke Us Paar". The song "Koyal Boli" was shot on the banks of the Godavari River in Rajahmundry, "Parbat Ke Us Par" in Ooty and "Dafliwale" in Kashmir.

The film became a huge success at the box office and took the top spot at the box office in 1979.  It made Jaya Prada a sensation and a star overnight in Hindi Cinema, and she also earned her first Filmfare nomination as Best Actress in Hindi cinema.

Plot
Hema, a young woman, unable to speak but is able to hear, is ill-treated by her stepmother, seeks her escape through classical dancing. Raju, a musician, helps to achieve her goal of becoming a dancer.

Cast
 Rishi Kapoor as Raju
 Jaya Prada as Hema Pradhan
 Shashikala as Savitri Pradhan, stepmother
 Dheeraj Kumar as Suresh
 Rajni Sharma as  Champa Pradhan
 Leela Mishra as Mausi
 Jankidas as Landlord
 Keshto Mukherjee as Tushar Babu Ghosh / Chatterjee
 Shreeram Lagoo as Masterji Chintamani Pradhan
 Trilok Kapoor as Dinu Chacha
 Om Shivpuri as Pandit
 Shakti Kapoor as Prakash
 Aruna Irani as Kusum
 Asrani as Gopi
 Vijay Arora as Dr. Babu (Guest appearance)
Kamaldeep as Rapist

Soundtrack
All the songs were composed by Laxmikant-Pyarelal and lyrics were penned by Anand Bakshi. With voice of Mohammed Rafi in all 7 songs. Among them 3 were duet with Lata Mangeshkar. The song “Dafli Wale Dafli Baja” was recreated by Vishal-Shekhar, in Student of the Year, in the song, Radha.

Awards
27th Filmfare Awards:
Won
 Best Music Director — Laxmikant-Pyarelal
Nominated
 Best Film — N. N. Sippy
 Best Actor — Rishi Kapoor
 Best Actress — Jaya Prada
 Best Comedian — Asrani
 Best Lyricist — Anand Bakshi for "Dafliwale"
Best Story — K. Viswanath

References

External links 
 

1979 films
1970s Hindi-language films
Films directed by K. Viswanath
Films scored by Laxmikant–Pyarelal
Hindi remakes of Telugu films
Films about disability in India
Films shot in Andhra Pradesh